Hamer's Brewery, or Hamer's Ales was a brewery that was operated from the Volunteer Inn, Bromley Cross, Turton, by three generations of the Hamer family over a period of almost a century.  The brewery was owned by the Hamers from 1853 until its sale to Dutton's Brewery in 1951. The whole of the Hamer's brewery including their properties were bought by Dutton's Blackburn Brewery in 1951 for £318,000.  Dutton's in turn were taken over by Whitbread's in 1964.

By the turn of the 20th Century the Hamer family owned a number of public houses in the Turton area, and in Bolton town centre, including the following:

Bolton Town Centre
The Academy, 148-150 Crook Street
The Blue Boar, 96 Deansgate
The Brown Cow, 153 Bradshawgate
The Queen's Hotel, 155 Bradshawgate
Town Hall Tavern, Victoria Square
The Victoria, Hotel Street
Bolton District
The Volunteer, Bromley Cross
The Sportsman, Bromley Cross
The Flag Inn, Bromley Cross
The Strawberry Duck, Entwistle
The Farmers Arms, Quarlton
The House without a Name, Harwood
The Seven Stars, Harwood
The Lamb, Bradshaw Road
The Bulls Head, Bury New Road
The Printers Arms, Birches Road, Turton
The Gardeners Arms, Turton
The Derby Arms, Edgworth
The Edge Tavern, Chorley Old Road
The Colliers, Montserrat
The Carters Arms, Astley Bridge
The Bay Mare, Asley Bridge
The Pineapple, Asley Bridge
The Wilton, Belmont Road
The Cheetham, Dunscar
The Bradford Arms, Foundry Street
The Crawford Arms, Bolton Street
The Dog and Snipe, Folds Road
The Farmers Arms, Derby Street
The Lord Raglan, Halliwell Road
The Uncle Tom's Cabin, Lever Street
The Union Arms, Eskrick Street
The Weavers Arms, Brunel Street
The Cross Keys, Cross Street
The Rose & Crown, Cross Street
The Bridge Inn, Westhoughton
The Farmers Arms, Darcy Lever
The Old Original British Queen, Blackburn Road

References

Companies based in Lancashire
Defunct breweries of the United Kingdom